Elmarie Louise Wendel (November 23, 1928 – c. July 21, 2018) was an American actress and singer best known as Mamie Dubcek on the NBC sitcom 3rd Rock from the Sun.

Early life 
Born on a farm in Howard County, Iowa, one of five siblings, Wendel spent her childhood travelling with her musical parents and dancing with her sisters in and around the Midwest in club and concert hall venues, including the Grand Ole Opry. She eventually made her way to New York City where she appeared in, among other productions, the original 1959 off-Broadway production of Little Mary Sunshine, starring Eileen Brennan and John McMartin.

Career 
A national touring company of Annie took her to Los Angeles, where she made a successful transition into film and television. She garnered the role of the eccentric Mrs. Dubcek on 3rd Rock from the Sun. From 1996 to 2001, she appeared in about 70 episodes of the show. She made appearances on such shows as Seinfeld, Love & War, Murphy Brown, Murder, She Wrote, and Empty Nest. She appeared in And the Band Played On and Far from Home. She had a recurring role as Gina, a lascivious assembly line co-worker of the title character on George Lopez. In 2008, she appeared on General Hospital in the recurring role of Peg. Her musical theatre credits include Wonderful Town, Cole Porter Revisited, Little Mary Sunshine and Gigi.

Personal life and death 
Wendel's daughter, J.C. Wendel, is also an actress. Her death was announced on her daughter's Instagram on July 21, 2018. No cause or place of death was given but Wendel had resided in Studio City, California, at the time of her death.

Filmography

Film

Television

Video games

References

External links 
 
 

1928 births
2018 deaths
Actresses from Iowa
American television actresses
American film actresses
American voice actresses
American video game actresses
American musical theatre actresses
People from Howard County, Iowa
Place of death missing
Singers from Iowa
20th-century American singers
20th-century American actresses
21st-century American actresses
20th-century American women singers